Sweetened potato casserole (Finnish imelletty perunalaatikko) is a traditional Finnish dish from Päijät-Häme, eaten elsewhere in Finland at Christmastime. It is prepared by letting puréed potatoes, mixed with wheat flour, stand at a temperature of around 50°C (122°F). The amylase in the flour will start to break down the potato's starches to shorter carbohydrate chains, that is sugars. The temperature cannot exceed 75°C (167°F); otherwise, the amylase molecules will break down. Through this process, the dish gets its distinct sweet flavour; nowadays, however, dark syrup (Finnish tumma siirappi) can be added to give it sweetness. Dark syrup is made from sugarcane and it's the most common type of syrup in Finland. It has a similar taste to molasses, but is sweeter.

See also
 List of casserole dishes
 List of potato dishes

References

External links
Glossary of Finnish dishes

Finnish cuisine
Potato dishes
Casserole dishes